Historic Edition is a limited edition 10-disc CD box set released by Klaus Schulze in 1995 containing unreleased archival recordings. This set was wholly included in Schulze's 50-disc CD box set The Ultimate Edition released in 2000 (discs 1, 3, and 4 were slightly remastered). Beginning in 2009, tracks from this set were reissued as La Vie Electronique, a series of 3-disc CD sets releasing all the material of The Ultimate Edition in chronological order.

Track listing

Disc 1: Live 1981 & 1977 (Disc 11 of The Ultimate Edition)

Disc 2: Live 1977 & 1976 (Disc 12 of The Ultimate Edition)

Disc 3: Live 1975 (Disc 13 of The Ultimate Edition)

Disc 4: Studio & Soundtrack 1970-1978 (Disc 14 of The Ultimate Edition)

Disc 5: Live 1981 & 1975 (Disc 15 of The Ultimate Edition)

Disc 6: Live 1976 (Disc 16 of The Ultimate Edition)

Disc 7: Studio 1973 & 1982 (Disc 17 of The Ultimate Edition)

Disc 8: Live 1976 & 1975 (Disc 18 of The Ultimate Edition)

Disc 9: Soundtrack & Studio 1976 & 1985 (Disc 19 of The Ultimate Edition)

Disc 10: Studio 1970–1975 (Disc 20 of The Ultimate Edition)

See also
Silver Edition
Jubilee Edition
Contemporary Works I
Contemporary Works II

References

External links
 Historic Edition at the official site of Klaus Schulze
 

Klaus Schulze albums
1995 compilation albums